Haeckeliidae is a family of ctenophores belonging to the order Cydippida.

Genera:
 ''Haeckelia Carus, 1863

References

Tentaculata